Robert Gordon Sproul (May 22, 1891 – September 10, 1975) was the first system-wide president (1952–1958) of the University of California system, and the last president (11th) of the University of California, Berkeley, serving from 1930 to 1952.

Background

Robert Gordon Sproul was born on May 22, 1891, in San Francisco, California, to Robert Sproul of Scotland and Sarah Elizabeth Sproul of New England.  He is the elder brother of central banker Allan Sproul, who served as chairman of the New York Federal Reserve.  In 1913, he earned a BS in engineering from the University of California at Berkeley, where his classmates included future Supreme Court justice Earl Warren.

Career

In 1913, Sproul started his career briefly as an efficiency engineer in Oakland, California.

In 1914, he began a 44-year track by joining the University of California's business office as a cashier and rose to controller, legislative lobbyist, and by 1925 secretary of the regents and vice president of finance and business affairs.

In June 1929, Sproul was chosen as the eleventh president of the University of California.  He immediately took a leave of absence to study other universities. In a 1930 speech, as president-elect he stated:  The glory of a university is obviously the men who constitute its faculty. It cannot be too often repeated that it is men, and nothing but men, who make education. The reason why the University of California occupies the high position it does throughout the academic world is that there has never been a time when its faculty could not boast of men who were finding their way along rough trails, illuminated only by the spark of genius, to the heights of scholarship. Within a few years after the receipt of its charter from the state, there were to be found in the University a goodly number of men whose reputation is even yet undimmed, such men as Daniel Coit Gilman, later president of Johns Hopkins University, Hilgard in agriculture, LeConte in geology, and many others. Nor is the present faculty devoid of men who, in their respective fields, hold high the lamp of learning--Campbell in astronomy, Kofoid in zoology, and G. N. Lewis in chemistry, to pick out a few of the most obvious. In a very real sense, such men are the University of California, and similarly elsewhere, for material development is futile without brains to use and to direct it and personality to irradiate it. Students are getting a gold brick if they go for education to a school where there are no great teachers.  He succeeded in maintaining the University of California school system as a Land Grant institution.

In 1936, Sproul added to his roles the job of provost of the University of California at Los Angeles through 1937. He organized the California Club that brought all campuses together. In 1944, he started an annual series of all-University faculty conferences.

During the Great Depression, expansion of facilities stopped.  After World War II, he served on the Committee for the Marshall Plan.

In the 1930s, 1940s, and 1950s, he struggled with student dissent (e.g., over conscriptions) and McCarthy-style accusations from the newspapers controlled by William Randolph Hearst about "communist influence" on campuses. Perhaps the biggest controversy during his presidency came in 1949 over a special non-Communist oath required of faculty by the regents of the University of California, known as the "Year of the Oath."  Forty professors who refused to sign were let go; a court restored their jobs in 1956.

Sproul's outstanding contribution during his 28-year administration was the multiple-campus expansion of the University to meet the demands for higher education in widely separated parts of the state while maintaining one institution governed by one board of regents and one president.  He also stopped the establishment of separate local colleges in 1931, 1945, and 1953.

California governor Earl Warren asked his former classmate and fellow 1911 member of the University of California Band, Sproul to place his name in nomination for the office of Vice President of the United States at the 1948 Republican National Convention in Philadelphia, Pennsylvania.

Sproul retired in 1958. He became active in the Save the Redwoods League (after being a member since 1921) and in the East Bay Regional Park District and served on the National Park Advisory Board. From his office as president emeritus, he gave a speech during the 1967 Free Speech Movement at Berkeley, by which he "contributed one of the few notes of humor in an otherwise grim confrontation." When student demonstrators broke into his office and scattered his papers, he told a reporter, "Nonsense. Nobody messed up my office. It always looks that way."

Personal and death

On September 16, 1916, Sproul married Ida Wittschen. They had three children.

Sproul was inspired by predecessor Benjamin Ide Wheeler, who was president when he first began to work for the University of California.

Sproul was a member of Abracadabra  (now Delta Chi Abracadabra), the Order of the Golden Bear, and the Bohemian Club - he sponsored Ernest Lawrence's membership in 1932.

He died age 84 on September 10, 1975, at home in Berkeley, California.

Honors, awards

Honorary degrees:
 1926: LLD from Occidental College
 1930: LLD from University of Southern California
 1930: LLD from University of San Francisco
 1931: LLD from Pomona College
 1932: LLD from University of Oregon
 1935: LLD from University of Nebraska
 1935: LLD from Yale University
 1938: LLD from University of Maine
 1938: LittD from Columbia University
 1940: LLD from University of New Mexico
 1940: LLD from Harvard University
 1943: LLD from Mills College
 1947: LLD from Princeton University
 1949: LLD from Tulane University
 1949: LLD from St. Mary's College
 1958: LLD from University of California at Berkeley
 1958: LHD from the University of California at Los Angeles
 1958: LLD from University of British Columbia
 1958: LLD from Rensselaer Polytechnic Institute
 1959: LLD from Brigham Young University

Foreign honors:
 Officier de l'Ordre National de la Legion d'Honneur (France)
 Knight of the Order of the Iron Crown (Italy)
 Royal Order of the North Star - Commander Second Class (Sweden)

He was given the Benjamin Ide Wheeler distinguished citizen award by the city of Berkeley, 1933; made an honorary fellow of Stanford University, 1941; and named "Alumnus of the Year" by the California Alumni Association in 1946.

(All honors and awards listed come from the University of California History - Digital Archives.)

Legacy

Achievements
At his death, the New York Times reported that the University of California owed its pre-eminence in science to Sproul, who transformed the school system from "a merely large institution" to "the biggest in the Western world... sprinkled with Nobel Prize winners." By the time he left office in 1958, the University of California, Berkeley, was a distinguished university recognized worldwide for the excellence of its programs and the University of California had a total of eight campuses from Davis to Los Angeles. Its student population had risen from 19,000 to 45,000 students. Its library had quadrupled to four million volumes. Its state support had risen nine times to $75 million.

Harvard University President James Bryan Conant and Columbia University President Nicholas Murray Butler said that Sproul was the university president of their time.

The Donahoe Act of 1960, although enacted after his retirement, helped fulfill his vision by integrating all higher education in California.

Buildings

Sproul Hall and Sproul Plaza on the University of California, Berkeley campus, site of numerous political rallies since the 1930s, are named for him.

At the University of California, Los Angeles campus, there are three residence halls named in his recognition: Sproul Hall, Sproul Landing, and Sproul Cove.

Sproul Hall on the University of California, Riverside campus, home to the Department of Economics and the Graduate School of Education, is named for him.

At the University of California, Davis campus, Sproul Hall was once the tallest building in Yolo County.

Research

A research vessel used by the Scripps Institution of Oceanography at University of California, San Diego is named the R/V Robert Gordon Sproul.

References

External links

 University of California: Robert Gordon Sproul and the University of California: A Memoir by Agnes Roddy Robb (1976)
 USCF Department of Psychiatry: Remarks by the Honorable Robert Gordon Sproul, President of the University of California, at the Laying of the Cornerstone of the Langley Porter Clinic of the California State Department of Institutions - April 5, 1941
 

1891 births
1975 deaths
People from San Francisco
University of California regents
Leaders of the University of California, Berkeley
Presidents of the University of California System
Educators from California
California Republicans
University of California, Berkeley alumni
20th-century American academics